Fahad Al-Dossari may refer to:
 Fahad Al-Dossari (footballer, born 1987)
 Fahad Al-Dossari (footballer, born 1990)
 Fahad Al-Dossari (footballer, born 2002)